Palace Playland is a seasonal amusement park located in Old Orchard Beach, Maine.  It has operated on the same site since 1902.

History
In the 1900s, Palace Playland's startup decade, the then-small amusement park centered on a roller skating rink and adjacent merry-go-round.  Simple summer refreshments were served, such as lemonade and salt water taffy.

In the 1950s, Palace Playland was operated by future banker and philanthropist Bernard Osher, a Maine native.

In the 1970s and 1980s, Palace Playland was noted for operating a 1910 Philadelphia Toboggan Company carousel, PTC #19; however, in 1996, the valuable antique was withdrawn from service and moved to Ohio.

In the 1990s, Palace Playland claimed to be "New England's largest pinball and video arcade."  A guidebook writer recommended the park to "aficionados of the garish."

Today
In the 2010s, Palace Playland describes itself as "New England's Only Beachfront Amusement Park."  In 2010–11, the park tore down and replaced its Ferris wheel. The Playland has positioned itself as a provider of amusement-park-experience services to French-speaking residents of Quebec, including offering a webpage in French.  In 2018, Palace Playland opened another new roller coaster known as the "Sea Viper" replacing the "Galaxi". In April 2020, Palace Playland implemented a cashless card system for its arcade.

Palace Playland is located directly on the waterfront, across Maine State Route 9 from the Old Orchard Beach Downeaster passenger railroad station.

Rides

See also
 Euclid Beach Park - discussion of history of PTC #19
 Funtown Splashtown USA - nearby OOB amusement park

References

External links
 

1902 establishments in Maine
Amusement parks in Maine
Buildings and structures in Old Orchard Beach, Maine